Charsley's Hall was a private hall of the University of Oxford. After 1891 it was renamed as Marcon's Hall.

The hall was established in 1862 by William Henry Charsley, formerly of Christ Church, under the university statute De Aulis Privatis (On private halls), passed in 1855, which allowed any Master of Arts or other member of Convocation aged at least twenty-eight years to open a private hall after obtaining a licence to do so. The hall was in what is now 10 Parks Road, at the eastern corner of Museum Road, on the other side of the road from the Oxford University Museum. It was a red-brick Victorian house designed by Charles Buckeridge and built in 1862. At the 1871 census, it contained nine residents.

Charsley's Hall had no published tuition fees, members electing their tutors and making their own arrangements for payment, but in general the terms were higher than elsewhere. Despite this, the hall was popular. One writer noted in 1883 

By 1889, migration to Charsley's was seen as a way of circumventing some requirements of the colleges, and its demise was prematurely foreseen by The Oxford Magazine. 
 
Charsley's Hall features several times in The Lay of the First Minstrel, a parody of Sir Walter Scott dating from the 1870s, beginning: 

In 1889–1890 Charsley's had forty-seven undergraduates, while Turrell's, the only other private hall, had seven. The Master, William Henry Charsley, appears to have kept a school for boys as well as a house of the university. This is suggested as a reason for matriculations at Charsley's at an unusually young age. By the end of 1891 Charsley's Hall had closed, to be reopened by Charles Abdy Marcon as Marcon's Hall in 1892. Marcon had himself been educated at Charsley's.

Whitaker's Almanack for 1897 lists three private halls in the university, based on the University Calendar for 1895: Marcon's, Turrell's and Grindle's. Marcon's continued under that name until C. A. Marcon retired in 1918.

Notable people
William Morfill taught philosophy and modern history at Charsley's between 1865 and 1869
Edward John Payne completed his first degree at Charsley's in 1871
Charles Abdy Marcon, who took his first degree from Charsley's in 1878, succeeded W. H. Charsley as Master in 1891

References

Private halls of the University of Oxford
Former colleges and halls of the University of Oxford
1854 establishments in England
1918 disestablishments in England